index Magazine was a New York City-based publication with interviews with art and culture figures. It was created by Peter Halley and Bob Nickas in 1996, running until late 2005.

Covering the burgeoning indie culture of the 1990s, Index regularly employed photographers Juergen Teller, Terry Richardson, Wolfgang Tillmans, and Ryan McGinley, and had interviews with Björk, Brian Eno, Marc Jacobs, and Scarlett Johansson, mixing new talents and established names in music, film, architecture, fashion, art, and politics. The publication also had interviews with local New York City personalities such as Queen Itchie and Ducky Doolittle.

In 2014, it launched Index A to Z: Art, Design, Fashion, Film, and Music in the Indie Era. The book about indie culture was published by Rizzoli.

The magazine also produced the online series Delusional Downtown Divas, starring Isabel Halley and Lena Dunham.

References

External links
 index Magazine website
 index A to Z Book

Defunct magazines published in the United States
Magazines established in 1996
Magazines disestablished in 2005
Magazines published in New York City
Visual arts magazines published in the United States